Nosovskaya is a rural locality (a village) in Rovdinskoye Rural Settlement of Shenkursky District, Arkhangelsk Oblast, Russia. The population was 9 as of 2010. There are 3 streets.

Geography 
It is located on the Puya River, 51 km south-west from Shenkursk.

References 

Rural localities in Shenkursky District